The Journal of Neuro-Oncology is a peer-reviewed medical journal covering cancer of the central nervous system. It was established in 1983 and is published 15 times per year by Springer Science+Business Media. It was originally published by Martinus Nijhoff Publishers and has been published by Springer since 2005.  It is the oldest continuously published journal focused on the field of Neuro-Oncology.

It is sponsored by the Tumor Section for the American Association of Neurological Surgeons and Congress of Neurological Surgeons.  It is co-sponsored by the Society of British Neurological Surgeons, the European Association of Neurosurgical Societies Section of Neuro-Oncology, the Korean Neurosurgical Society, the Chinese Society for Neuro-Oncology (CSNO), the Grupo Interdisciplinario Mexicano de Investigacion en Neuro-Oncologia, the Radiosurgery Society, the Society for NeuroOncology Latin America, the Indian Society of Neuro-Oncology, and the Taiwan Society for Neuro-Oncology (TSNO).

The current editor-in-chief is Jason P. Sheehan (University of Virginia). Previous editors include Joseph M. Piepmeier (Yale University) and Linda M. Liau (David Geffen School of Medicine at UCLA).

Abstracting and indexing 
The journal is abstracted and indexed in:

According to the Journal Citation Reports, the journal has a 2020 impact factor of 4.130.

Members of the Editorial Board include the following:

Associate Editors:

Roger Abounader, University of Virginia School of Medicine, Charlottesville, VA, USA

Jill Barnholtz-Sloan, Cleveland, OH, USA

Eric Bouffet, University of Toronto, Toronto, Ontario, Canada

Jeffrey N. Bruce, Columbia University, New York, NY

Linda M. Liau, Brain Research Institute, UCLA Medical Center, Los Angeles, CA

Arjun Sahgal, Sunnybrook Health Sciences Centre, Toronto, Ontario, Canada

Chris Cifarelli, West Virginia University, Morgantown, WV

Editorial Board:

Manish K. Aghi, San Francisco, CA, USA

Manmeet Ahluwalia, Cleveland, OH, USA

Marco Alegria, Mexico City, Mexico

Mitchel S. Berger, San Francisco, CA, USA

Deborah Blumenthal, Tel-Aviv, Israel  

John A. Boockvar, New York, NY, USA

Steven Brem, Philadelphia, PA, USA

William Broaddus, Richmond, VA, USA

John M. Buatti, Iowa City, IA, USA

Miguel Angel Celis, Mexico City, Mexico

Arnab Chakravarti, Columbus, OH, USA

Samuel Chao, Cleveland, OH, USA

Thomas C. Chen, Los Angeles, CA, USA

Zhong-ping Chen, Guangzhou, China

Shi-Yuan Cheng, Pittsburgh, PA, USA

Christopher P. Cifarelli, Morgantown, WV, USA

Charles S. Cobbs, San Francisco, CA, USA

William T. Couldwell, Salt Lake City, UT, USA

Sunit Das, Toronto, ON, Canada

Lisa DeAngelis, New York, NY, USA

Waldemar Debinski, Winston-Salem, NC, USA

Franco DeMonte, Houston, TX, USA

Francesco DiMeco, Milan, Italy

Ian F. Dunn, Boston, MA, USA

Gavin Dunn, St. Louis, MO, USA

Camilo E. Fadul, Charlottesville, VA, USA  

Gaetano Finocchiaro, Milan, Italy  

Atul Goel, Mumbai, Maharashtra, India

Tejpal Gupta, Mumbai, Maharashtra, India

Costas G. Hadjipanayis, New York, NY, USA

Sanford P.S. Hsu, Taipei, Taiwan

Martin K. Hunn, Wellington, New Zealand

Jeong-Hyun Hwang, Daegu, Korea

Fabio Iwamoto, New York, NY, USA

Michael D. Jenkinson, Liverpool, UK

Randy L. Jensen, Salt Lake City, UT, USA  

Ulf  D. Kahlert, Düsseldorf, Germany

Ekkehard Kasper, Boston, MA, USA

Andrew H. Kaye, Melbourne, Australia

Soumen Khatua, Houston, TX, USA

Dong-Gyu Kim, Seoul, Korea

Se-Hyuk Kim, Suwon, Korea

John J. Kresl, Phoenix, AZ, USA

Albert Lai, Los Angeles, CA, USA

Joseph L. Lasky, Los Angeles, CA, USA

Andrew B. Lassman, New York, NY, USA

Eudocia Q. Lee, Boston, MA, USA  

Emilie Le Rhun, Lille, France

Maciej Lesniak, Chicago, IL, USA

Michael Lim, Baltimore, MD, USA

Chun-Fu Lin, Taipei, Taiwan

Pedro Lowenstein, Ann Arbor, MI, USA

Marcos V.C. Maldaun, São Paulo, Brazil

Suzana M.F. Malheiros, São Paulo, Brazil

Akira Matsuno, Tokyo, Japan

Gordon McComb, Los Angeles, CA, USA

Michael McDermott, San Francisco, CA, USA

Ingo Mellinghoff, New York, NY, USA

Dattatraya Muzumdar, Mumbai, Maharashtra, India

Brian V. Nahed, Boston, MA, USA

Masayuki Nitta, Tokyo, Japan

Antonio Omuro, New York, NY, USA

Brian Patrick O'Neill, Rochester, MN, USA

Edward Pan, Dallas, TX, USA

Hung-Chuan Pan, Taichung, Taiwan

Whitney Pope, Los Angeles, CA, USA

Daniel Prevedello, Columbus, OH, USA

Stephen Price, Cambridge, UK

Robert M. Prins, Los Angeles, CA, USA

Raj K. Puri, Bethesda, MD, USA

Alfredo Quinones-Hinojosa, Jacksonville, FL, USA

Prashant Raghavan, Baltimore, MD, USA

Guilherme C. Ribas, São Paulo, Brazil

Patrick Roth, Zurich, Switzerland

Raymond Sawaya, Houston, TX, USA

Michael Schulder, Lake Success, NY, USA

Michael E. Sughrue, Oklahoma City, OK, USA  

Tarik Tihan, San Francisco, CA, USA

Daniel M. Trifiletti, Jacksonville, FL, USA

Hiroaki Wakimoto, Boston, MA, USA

Ronald E. Warnick, Cincinnati, OH, USA

Katherine E. Warren, Bethesda, MD, USA

Howard L. Weiner, New York, NY, USA

Michael Weller, Zurich, Switzerland

Max Wintermark, Stanford, CA, USA

Anhua Wu, Shenyang, China

Isaac Yang, Los Angeles, CA, USA

William H. Yong, Los Angeles, CA, USA

Daizo Yoshida, Tokyo, Japan

Brad Evan Zacharia, Hershey, PA, USA

Gabriel Zada, Los Angeles, CA, USA

Jay-Jiguang Zhu, Houston, TX, USA

Editor Emeritus:

Joseph Piepmeier, New Haven, CT, USA

Social Media Editors:

Gautam Mehta, Los Angeles, CA, USA

Matthew Shepard, Charlottesville, VA, USA

References

External links 
 

Publications established in 1983
Oncology journals
Springer Science+Business Media academic journals
English-language journals
Journals published between 13 and 25 times per year